Richard Parsons (June 20, 1910 – March 12, 1999) was an American cross-country skier. He competed at the 1932 Winter Olympics and the 1936 Winter Olympics.

References

1910 births
1999 deaths
American male cross-country skiers
Olympic cross-country skiers of the United States
Cross-country skiers at the 1932 Winter Olympics
Cross-country skiers at the 1936 Winter Olympics
People from Salisbury, Connecticut
20th-century American people